Jubiliejnaja plošča is a Minsk Metro station.  It is located on Jubiliejnaja plošča at the intersection of Suchaja and Kaĺvaryjskaja streets. The station was opened on November 6, 2020.

It is a transfer station to the Frunzyenskaya station on the Awtazavodskaya line. The station is the deepest in the Minsk metro - its depth is 32 meters.

Gallery

References

Minsk Metro stations
Railway stations opened in 2020